This Bruce Coville bibliography covers the over 100 books written by young adult fiction author Bruce Coville.

Series

The Magic Shop
The Monster's Ring. Aladdin (1989). 
Jeremy Thatcher, Dragon Hatcher (1990). Aladdin (1992). 
Jennifer Murdley's Toad. Minstrel (1993). 
The Skull of Truth.  Aladdin (1999). 
Juliet Dove, Queen of Love. Harcourt (2003). 

My Teacher Is an Alien
My Teacher Is an Alien. Aladdin (1989). 
My Teacher Fried my Brains. Aladdin (1991). 
My Teacher Glows in the Dark. Aladdin (1991). 
My Teacher Flunked the Planet. Aladdin (1992). 

I Was a Sixth Grade Alien
I Was a Sixth Grade Alien. Aladdin (1999). 
The Attack of the Two-Inch Teacher. Aladdin (1999). 
I Lost My Grandfather's Brain. Aladdin (1999). 
Peanut Butter Lover Boy. Aladdin (2000). 
Zombies of the Science Fair. Aladdin (2000). 
Don't Fry My Veeblax! Aladdin (2000). 
Too Many Aliens. Aladdin (2000). 
Snatched From Earth. Aladdin (2000). 
There's an Alien in My Backpack. Aladdin (2000). 
The Revolt of the Miniature Mutants. Aladdin (2001). 
There's an Alien in My Underwear. Aladdin (2001). 
Farewell to Earth. Aladdin (2001). 

The Unicorn Chronicles
Into the Land of the Unicorns. Scholastic (1994). 
Song of the Wanderer. Scholastic (1999). 
Dark Whispers. Scholastic (2008) 
The Last Hunt. Scholastic (2010) 
Moongobble and Me
The Dragon of Doom. Simon & Schuster (2003). 
The Weeping Werewolf. Simon & Schuster (2004). 
The Evil Elves. Simon & Schuster (2004). 
The Mischief Monster Simon & Schuster (2007). 
The Naughty Nork Aladdin (2009). 

Space Brat
Space Brat 
Space Brat 2: Blork's Evil Twin  
Space Brat 3: The Wrath of Squat 
Space Brat 4: Planet of the Dips 
Space Brat 5: The Saber-Toothed Poodnoobie 

Rod Albright Alien Adventures
Aliens Ate My Homework
I Left My Sneakers in Dimension X
The Search for Snout (Aliens Stole My Dad in the UK)
Aliens Stole My Body

Bruce Coville's Book of...
Bruce Coville's Book of Monsters
Bruce Coville's Book of Aliens
Bruce Coville's Book of Ghosts
Bruce Coville's Book of Nightmares
Bruce Coville's Book of Spine Tinglers
Bruce Coville's Book of Magic
Bruce Coville's Book of Monsters II
Bruce Coville's Book of Aliens II
Bruce Coville's Book of Ghosts II
Bruce Coville's Book of Nightmares II
Bruce Coville's Book of Spine Tinglers II
Bruce Coville's Book of Magic II

Shakespeare retellings
The Tempest
A Midsummer Night's Dream
Macbeth
Romeo and Juliet
Hamlet
Twelfth Night
The Winter's Tale

Nina Tanleven
The Ghost in the Third Row
The Ghost Wore Gray
The Ghost in the Big Brass Bed

The A. I. Gang
Operation Sherlock
The Cutlass Clue was written by Jim Lawrence
Robot Trouble
Forever Begins Tomorrow

Camp Haunted Hills
How I Survived My Summer Vacation
Some of My Best Friends Are Monsters
The Dinosaur that Followed Me Home

Bruce Coville's Chamber of Horrors
Amulet of Doom
Spirits and Spells
Eyes of the Tarot
Waiting Spirit

The Enchanted Files
Cursed. (Originally published as Diary of a Mad Brownie). Random House Books for Young Readers (2015). 
Hatched. Random House Books for Young Readers (2016). 
Trolled. Random House Books for Young Readers (2017)

Anthologies

A Glory of Unicorns
Half Human
Herds of Thunder, Manes of Gold
The Unicorn Treasury
Bruce Coville's Shapeshifters
Bruce Coville's Alien Visitors
Bruce Coville's Strange Worlds
Bruce Coville's UFOs
Oddly Enough Simon & Schuster (1994). 
Odder Than Ever (1999)
Odds Are Good Harcourt (2006). 
Oddest of All (2008)

Young adult novels

Armageddon Summer
Fortune's Journey
Space Station Ice-3 (published by Omni Odysseys)

Middle grade novels

The Dragonslayers 
Goblins in the Castle (1992) 
Goblins on the Prowl
Monster of the Year
The Monsters of Morley Manor
The World's Worst Fairy Godmother
Thor's Wedding Day
Always October
Amber Brown is Tickled Pink (with Elizabeth Levy, September 13, 2012)
Amber Brown Is on the Move (with Elizabeth Levy, September 12, 2013)
Amber Brown Horses Around (with Elizabeth Levy, September 11, 2014)

Picture books

The Foolish Giant
The Lapsnatcher
My Grandfather's House
The Prince of Butterflies
Sarah and the Dragon
Sarah's Unicorn
Hans Brinker (retelling)

Nonfiction

Prehistoric People

Contribution to the Dungeon series, organized by Philip José Farmer

The Dark Abyss

References

Coville, Bruce